ULSA or Ulsa may refer to:

 "ULSA" is an acronym for Universidad La Salle in Mexico
 Ulsa (乙巳)  or Eulsa was the year corresponding to 1905 according to the traditional Korean calendar
 Ulsa treaty or "Eulsa treaty" is metonymn for the Japan–Korea Treaty of 1905
 A misspelling of ulcer
A character in the music video 'do not hold on to it' by EdukayFUN 2.0
 Uganda Landmine Survivors Association